Jamiel Kevon Hardware (born 12 March 1992) is a Jamaican footballer who currently plays for the Jamaica National Premier League Arnett Gardens F.C.

Career

Club 
After a short spell with USL PDL club Ventura County Fusion, Hardware played with the Harrisburg City Islanders in the USL Pro for the 2013 and 2014 seasons.

On 7 March 2015, it was announced that Hardware had signed with USL expansion side Saint Louis FC.

In August 2018, Hardware transferred to Arnett Gardens F.C.

International 

Hardware made his senior international debut in 2017.

Statistics

International goals
Scores and results list Jamaica's goal tally first.

References

External links
 
 USL Profile 
 Saint Louis FC bio

1992 births
Living people
Jamaican footballers
Jamaican expatriate footballers
Ventura County Fusion players
Motala AIF players
Penn FC players
Saint Louis FC players
Expatriate soccer players in the United States
Expatriate footballers in Sweden
USL League Two players
USL Championship players
Association football midfielders